Matheus Santos Soares (born 29 July 1998), known as Matheus Santos or Matheusinho, is a Brazilian footballer who plays as an attacking midfielder for Goiás.

Club career
Born in São Bernardo do Campo, São Paulo, Matheusinho was an América Mineiro youth graduate, but made his senior debut while on loan to Guarani-MG in 2017. Upon returning to his parent club, he featured mainly with the under-20s before making his first team debut on 11 March 2018, starting in a 1–1 Campeonato Mineiro away draw against Villa Nova.

On 16 March 2018, five days after his debut, Matheusinho renewed his contract with América until December 2020. However, he did not appear for the side again, serving loan deals at Santo André, Rio Claro and Nacional de Muriaé.

On 9 April 2021, Matheusinho signed for Sertãozinho. He subsequently represented Série D side Patrocinense before joining Veranópolis on 2 September.

On 14 December 2021, Matheusinho agreed to a deal with Ypiranga-RS in the Série C. After being a regular starter as the side reached the 2022 Campeonato Gaúcho Finals, he moved to Série A side Goiás on 12 April 2022.

Matheusinho made his debut for the Esmeraldino on 31 May 2022, coming on as a second-half substitute for Apodi in a 1–0 away win over Red Bull Bragantino, for the year's Copa do Brasil. His top tier debut occurred six days later, as he started in a 2–1 away win over Botafogo but had to leave after just nine minutes due to a serious knee injury.

Career statistics

References

External links
Goiás profile 

1998 births
Living people
People from São Bernardo do Campo
Brazilian footballers
Association football midfielders
Campeonato Brasileiro Série A players
Campeonato Brasileiro Série C players
Campeonato Brasileiro Série D players
América Futebol Clube (MG) players
Guarani Esporte Clube (MG) players
Esporte Clube Santo André players
Rio Claro Futebol Clube players
Sertãozinho Futebol Clube players
Clube Atlético Patrocinense players
Veranópolis Esporte Clube Recreativo e Cultural players
Ypiranga Futebol Clube players
Goiás Esporte Clube players
21st-century Brazilian people